Tutkheperre Shoshenq or Shoshenq IIb is an obscure Third Intermediate Period Libyan king whose existence was until recently doubted. In 2004, a GM 203 German article by Eva R. Lange on a newly discovered stone block decoration from the Temple of Bubastis that bore his rare royal prenomen, Tutkheperre, confirmed his existence because his name is found in Lower and Upper Egypt. Tutkheperre's prenomen translates approximately as "Appearance (or Coming Forth) of the Image of Re."

Evidence for existence 
This king was first attested in Ostracon Louvre E.31886 discovered at Abydos in Upper Egypt by Émile Amélineau (1850–1915) in his 19th century excavations. This ostracon is now in the Louvre Museum and was examined by M. A. Bonheme in a 1995 paper titled "Les Chechanquides: Qui, Combien?" According to Bonheme, the Ostracon contains the name 'Tutkheperre [...]Amun| (Shoshenq MeryAmun)|' written in black ink and was discovered among votive deposits, starting from the New Kingdom onwards near the First Dynasty 'Tomb of Osiris' at Abydos in Upper Egypt.

The ostracon evidence was not considered conclusive evidence for this king's existence since the writer of this object was assumed to have mistakenly written the small bird or chick symbol for 'Tut' instead of the Red Crown symbol for Hedj, as in king Hedjkheperre Shoshenq I. However, in her 2004 GM paper, Lange notes that the name Tutkheperre cannot be a mistake for either Shoshenq I or for "Tjetkheperre", Psusennes II's prenomen, because their hieroglyphic symbols are completely different. Secondly, the prenomen Tutkheperre is inscribed in an architectural building in Bubastis (Lower Egypt). Lange's GM 203 article established that this king was genuine and distinct from Shoshenq I or Psusennes II. It examines an architectural fragment from the Great Temple of Bubastis which mentions his unique prenomen and nomen: 'Tutkheperre Shoshenq'. The likelihood of an error here is remote because these stone architectural blocks were created by professionally trained royal artisans who would not mistakenly transcribe a king's throne name onto a royal monument or temple. Tutkheperre Shoshenq's reign was probably brief because he is unattested beyond these two documents.

Twenty-second Dynasty timeline
Karl Jansen-Winkeln surmises in a footnote at the conclusion of Lange's paper that this new king should be dated to the first half of the 22nd Dynasty because his rule is attested in Upper and Lower Egypt. This is a logical deduction since Shoshenq III of the 22nd Dynasty lost effective control over Upper Egypt in his 8th year with the accession of Pedubast I at Thebes. Secondly, Lange notes that Tutkheperre Shoshenq is documented at the Temple of Bubastis where other early 22nd Dynasty monarchs such as Osorkon I and Osorkon II are well known for their building projects there. Thus, he should be placed somewhere between these two kings.

While his precise location in the framework of the 22nd Dynasty is a mystery, Tutkheperre is more likely to have been one of the unknown "3 Kings" — apart from Shoshenq II who ruled Egypt between Osorkon I and Takelot I, as Africanus' generally more accurate copy of Manetho's Epitome states. The only fact which is certain is that he could not intervene in the transition between Shoshenq I to Osorkon I because Osorkon I certainly succeeded his father. This leaves a short interregnum of a few years in the transition between Osorkon I to Takelot I during the 880s BC before Takelot I becoming king. Tutkheperre certainly ruled Egypt before the reign of Osorkon II who adopts the generic Ramesses II-based prenomen of 'Usimare Setepenre/Setepenamun' for his royal name.

Several short-lived kings could plausibly fit into this transition period such as Shoshenq II at 2–3 years and Tutkheperre Shoshenq because Takelot I was a relatively minor son of Osorkon I by Queen Tashedkhons, who was a lesser wife of this king. Takelot I may, thus, have been obliged to wait a while before assuming power in favour of other higher ranking royal family members with stronger claims to the throne.

References

Further reading 
Émile Amélineau, 'Les nouvelles fouilles d'Abydos 1897–1898' (fl), 147.
Eva R. Lange, Ein Neuer König Schoschenk in Bubastis, Göttinger Miszellen 203(2004), pp. 65–71.

9th-century BC Pharaohs
Pharaohs of the Twenty-second Dynasty of Egypt